Nonviolent Peaceforce (NP) is a nonpartisan unarmed peacekeeping organization with the goal of protecting civilians and reducing violence in areas affected by armed conflict. NP holds Special Consultative Status with the Economic and Social Council of the United Nations, and has been endorsed by nine Nobel Peace Prize laureates, including the Dalai Lama and former South African Archbishop Desmond Tutu. In 2016, Nonviolent Peaceforce was nominated for a Nobel Peace Prize.

History
The organization was founded by David Hartsough, a US Quaker and civil rights activist, and Mel Duncan, former US member of the Nicaragua coffee/cotton brigades during the Contra war of 1984. The organization, first prompted by a 1999 citizens' conference in The Hague, was founded in New Delhi in 2002.

Mel Duncan served as Executive Director until 2009, in Minneapolis, MN. The central office moved to Brussels, Belgium in 2010 under Executive Director Tim Wallis, while retaining its U.S. operations in Minneapolis,  near the Loring Park neighborhood. The organization was led by Doris Mariani until 31 May 2016, when Executive Director Tiffany Easthom took over. The organization has central offices in St. Paul, MN, and Brussels, Belgium. It is registered in the US as a 501(c)(3) organization and in Belgium as an AISBL.

Work

Past Projects

Sri Lanka (2003–2011) 
The pilot project of NP was started in 2003 in Sri Lanka. Nonviolent Peaceforce peacekeepers were at work there between 2003 and 2008 but they could not stop the war that reoccurred in 2008 and came to an end only when the SLA defeated LTTE in May 2009.  After 2009, NP continued work in the country for two years, mainly on child protection, helping to integrate former child soldiers back into everyday life, and working with local communities to bolster their own self-protection capabilities.  In 2011, NP officially closed its mission in Sri Lanka.

Guatemala (2007) 
NP had a short-term engagement in Guatemala in 2007.  Nonviolent Peaceforce had been invited by the Unidad de Protección a Defensoras y Defensores de Derechos Humanos (UDEFEGUA), the Protection Unit for Human Rights Defenders.  During the presidential elections taking place in September and November 2007, violence increased and human rights defenders were threatened; a small team of four members focused on accompanying the human rights defenders or being present in their office day and night.  NP's work there allowed human rights defenders to function in a hostile climate, and they left shortly after elections were finished.

South Caucasus (2012–2014) 
After an exploratory mission in the region, NP deployed its team to the South Caucasus in 2012.  There they worked along the Administrative Boundary Line between Georgian Tbilisi-Administered-Territories and de facto South Ossetia on civilian protection capacities in the region while canvassing to determine other places in the area that might benefit from unarmed civilian protection.  NP left the area in 2014.

Ukraine (2015) 
After many rounds of exploration missions in the country, Nonviolent Peaceforce was invited to Ukraine in March 2015 to conduct trainings on unarmed civilian protection for civil society groups and the communities they serve.  This was conducted with the Association for Middle Eastern Studies and was the first time UCP had been introduced in Ukraine.

Bangladesh (2018–2019) 

Nonviolent Peaceforce started working in Cox's Bazar, the world’s largest refugee camp located in Bangladesh in 2018.  As the refugee crisis unfolds, and overwhelming humanitarian needs emerge, the NP team is working with local partners to improve the safety of people living in the camp and to prepare for the flooding and mudslides of the rainy season. NP is building collaborative relationships with local non-governmental organizations, internal Rohingya-led organizations, and international non-governmental organizations and is providing protection to these organizations responsible for overseeing the camp.

Lebanon/Syria (2012–2018) 
Nonviolent Peaceforce's activity in the Middle East began in 2012 with a joint training with the UN Office on Genocide Prevention and Responsibility to Protect for activists in civil society in Lebanon and Syria.  The seminar was part of an initiative by the UN in response to increasing polarization in the area.

Ongoing Projects

Philippines (2007–) 
In Mindanao, Philippines a ceasefire was the starting point for the invitation of NP by local peace organizations (e.g. Mindanao peoples Caucus and Consortium of Bangsamoro Civil Society). After a short time, NP Philippines was part of the International Monitoring Team (IMT) to oversee the ceasefire agreement between the Philippine Army and the Moro Islamic Liberation Front, a guerilla organization that sought independence and later self-determination for the southern island of Mindanao. NP is responsible for the Civilian Protection Component which had its antecedents (and still relies on) the Independent Fact-Finding Committee and Bantay Ceasefire.

An impact evaluation done in May 2014 found that citizens in Mindanao felt safer due to Nonviolent Peaceforce’s presence and their role as part of the CPC for IMT.

Southern part of Sudan, now Republic of South Sudan (2010–) 
After the cancellation of a proposed project in Uganda, the peace agreement between Sudan and the Sudan Liberation Army as well as the planned independence referendum in South Sudan in January 2011 provided a starting point for exploring and later implementing a project in Sudan/South Sudan.

Two Sudanese organizations, the Institute for the Promotion of Civil Society (IPCS) and the Sudanese Organization for Nonviolence and Development (SONAD),  invited NP to assist  in preventing violence before and during the forthcoming elections and referendum. The more general task, also for the time after the referendum, was to build up local expertise for preventing and mediating in inter-ethnic conflicts in the region. The assignment was led by a Sri Lankan peacekeeper who was responsible for the  protection of children in Sri Lanka. In South Sudan, UNICEF financed a similar project specifically for Ugandan child soldiers who were recruited by the Lord's Resistance Army (LRA). The field offices have since been extended to ten teams.

Much of Nonviolent Peaceforce’s work in South Sudan focuses on child protection and women’s protection. They have successfully trained many women on the ground to form “Women’s Peacekeeping Teams” (WPTs) in order to reduce gender-based violence on the ground.  WPTs have also been cited as empowering women on the ground in South Sudan while simultaneously emphasizing the importance of protecting women and children.

On 8 March 2016, Nonviolent Peaceforce launched an $8 million project on "Promoting Women's Role in Peacebuilding and Gender-Based Violence Prevention in South Sudan".  The funding for the project came from the Kingdom of the Netherlands, and will be functionally funded through the Dutch Embassy in South Sudan.

Myanmar (2012–) 
In 2012, Nonviolent Peaceforce received an official invitation from the Government of Myanmar.  One of the main tasks NP has there is to monitor ceasefires and to set up mechanisms by which civilians can monitor them.  They hold trainings across the country for these purposes.  NP is also supporting women's organizations on the ground, aiding them in taking a more prominent role in guiding decision-making at the local level.

Iraq (2017–) 

Nonviolent Peaceforce began work in Iraq in February 2017, establishing an office in Erbil, in the Kurdistan Region of Iraq (KRI) and deploying staff to facilitate the start-up of a country programme. NP initially focused on the provision of frontline protection services to internally displaced persons (IDP) along the displacement corridors during the military offensives to retake ISIS-controlled areas. Since the end of major combat operations against ISIS, NP has refocused efforts on vulnerable IDPs in camps, returnees in contested and high-risk areas, tensions along the disputed Federal Iraq and KRI border, and arbitrary detentions.

Organizational Elements 

The work of NP consists of three pillars: projects in conflict areas; lobbying, especially within United Nations as well as European Commission and European Parliament; training. The organizational and administrative day-to-day duties are carried out by the secretariat- headed by the Executive Director. The programmatic work (on projects, explorations, budget and policies) is the task of the international board called International Governing Council (IGC).

Awards
Together with its founder Mel Duncan, the organization in 2007 received the International Pfeffer Peace Award from the Fellowship of Reconciliation. The Luxembourg Peace Prize was awarded to the organization in 2018.

See also 
 List of anti-war organizations
 Peacebuilding
 Third Party Nonviolent Intervention
 Civilian-based defense

External links

References 

International nongovernmental organizations
Nonviolence organizations
Peace organisations based in Belgium
Pfeffer Peace Prize laureates